The Trans-Saharan gas pipeline (TSGP; also known as NIGAL pipeline and Trans-African gas pipeline) is a planned natural gas pipeline from Nigeria to Algeria. It is seen as an opportunity to diversify the European Union's gas supplies.

History
The idea of the trans-Saharan pipeline was first proposed in the 1970s. On 14 January 2002, the Nigerian National Petroleum Corporation (NNPC) and Algerian national oil and gas company Sonatrach signed the Memorandum of Understanding for preparations of the project.  In June 2005, NNPC and Sonatrach signed a contract with Penspen Limited for a feasibility study of the project.  The feasibility study was completed in September 2006, and it found the pipeline to be technically and economically feasible and reliable.

On the meeting on 20 February 2009, NNPC and Sonatrach agreed to proceed with the draft Memorandum of Understanding between three governments and the joint venture agreement.  The intergovernmental agreement on the pipeline was signed by energy ministers of Nigeria, Niger and Algeria on 3 July 2009 in Abuja.

Safety concerns about the operations have been heightened due to a terrorist insurgency in North Africa, culminating in incidents like the In Aménas hostage crisis of 2013. Nigeria, Niger and Algeria are among the least secure areas in the region because of various active terrorist movements that destabilise them.

On 28 July 2022, The Algerian, Nigerian and Nigerien Ministers of Energy signed a Memorandum of understanding (MoU) for the implementation of the Trans-Saharan Gas Pipeline (TSGP) project, co-signed by Algerian Minister of Energy and Mines, Mohamed Arkab, Nigerian Minister of State for Petroleum Resources, Timipre Sylva and Nigerien Minister of Energy and Renewable Energy, at the end of the work of the third tripartite ministerial meeting held in Algiers.

Route
The pipeline will start in the Warri region in Nigeria and run north through Niger to Hassi R'Mel in Algeria. In Hassi R'Mel the pipeline will connect to the existing Trans-Mediterranean, Maghreb–Europe, Medgaz and Galsi pipelines. These supply Europe from the gas transmission hubs at El Kala and Beni Saf on Algeria's Mediterranean coast.

Technical features
The annual capacity of the pipeline would be up to 30 billion cubic meters of natural gas. The pipeline was originally expected to be operational by 2015. The original investment for the pipeline was expected to be around US$10 billion and for gas gathering centers around $3 billion.

In the year 2019 the project is still in the prospect phase

Operator
The pipeline is to be built and operated by the partnership between the NNPC and Sonatrach. The company would include also the Republic of Niger.  Initially NNPC and Sonatrach would hold a total 90% of shares, while Niger would hold 10%.

Russian gas company Gazprom has negotiated with Nigeria about its possible participation in the project.  Also Indian company GAIL, France's Total S.A., Italy's Eni SpA and Royal Dutch Shell have expressed interest in participating in the project.  According to the Algerian energy minister Chakib Khelil "only partners that can bring something to the project, not just money, should be there."  Energy ministers of Algeria and Nigeria have said that "if things go well, there will be no need to bring international oil companies into the project" and "if the need for partnership in the project arises, not every partner will be welcome on board on the project."

Opposition to the pipeline
The pipeline is opposed by the Nigerian militant group Movement for the Emancipation of the Niger Delta. A spokesman for the group warned that until issues regarding the exploitation of the Niger Delta and its people have been resolved, "any money put into the project will go down the drain."

See also

 West African Gas Pipeline

References

External links
 NIGAL project presentation
 Gaslink Nigeria Limited

Natural gas pipelines in Nigeria
Natural gas pipelines in Niger
Natural gas pipelines in Algeria
Proposed pipelines in Africa
Niger–Nigeria relations
Algeria–Nigeria relations
Algeria–Niger relations
Proposed energy infrastructure in Nigeria
Proposed energy infrastructure in Algeria
Proposed energy infrastructure in Niger